QuickCam is a line of webcam video camera products by Logitech.

The original QuickCam was developed by Connectix in 1994 for nationwide commercial sale and was the first widely marketed webcam-like device, although its original advertising did not use the term "webcam" or refer to the World Wide Web, then in its infancy.  Video conferencing via computers already existed at the time, and client-server based video conferencing software such as CU-SeeMe was gaining popularity. Eventually, it evolved from an RS-422 connector to a parallel connector then eventually to a USB connection. It is now considered one of the top gadgets of all time.

The initial model was available only for the Apple Macintosh, connecting to it via the serial port. It produced 16 shades of gray at a resolution of 320×240 pixels, and could record video at about 15 frames per second; it cost $100.

The software that originally shipped with the camera included QuickMovie for recording motion pictures and QuickPICT for capturing still images.

The QuickCam product line was acquired by Logitech in 1998. The company has gradually decreased support for the Macintosh platform, with only one current model officially supporting Mac or including Mac drivers. This could largely be the result of Apple building webcams into their laptop and desktop computers, negating the need for external third party devices .  Many recent models implement the USB video device class standard and work under Mac OS without additional drivers.

Today, Logitech QuickCam is one of the world's most recognized webcam brands.

In October 2010, QuickCam was elected to Time Magazine's Top 100 Gadgets of all Time

Cameras 

This list is non-exhaustive.

See also 
 History of videotelephony
 List of video telecommunication services and product brands
 Videoconferencing

References

External links 
 Logitech's home page
 Macam project at SourceForge.net
 Connectix QuickCam - All-TIME 100 Gadgets - TIME
 Steves Ant Farm Cam home page
 Logitech product numbers and driver support

Webcams
Teleconferencing
Videotelephony
Products introduced in 1994
Logitech products